Ice Cream is a 2015 Indian Tulu film directed by Venu Gopal Shetty and Pritham Sagar. Roopesh Shetty and Anvitha Rao stars in lead roles.

Cast
 Roopesh Shetty
 Anvitha Rao
 Dayanand Kukkaje
 Dinesh Attavar
 Manohar Prasad
 Arunchandra B.C.Road
 Chethan Rai Mani
 Rohini Jagaram
 Prasad Shakthinagar
 Vijay Mayya
 Narayan Shabaraya
 Mimicry Sharan
 Harish Kadandale
 M. Shivaprakash

Soundtrack
The soundtrack of the film was composed by Madhan Mohan and Background score by Giridhar Dhiwan. The soundtrack album was released on 20 August 2015.

References

2015 films